The Circle of the Rhine or Rhine Circle, sometimes the Bavarian  ( or ), was the name given to the territory on the west bank of the Rhine from 1816 to 1837 which was one of 15 (later 8) administrative districts of the Kingdom of Bavaria. Before the French revolutionary wars (1792) most of the land had belonged to the Electoral Palatinate. At the Congress of Vienna in 1815 it was initially promised to the Empire of Austria after having been under a provisional joint Austro-Bavarian administration since 1814. However, in the Treaty of Munich (1816), Austria relinquished the territory to Bavaria.

In 1837, the Circle of the Rhine was renamed the Palatinate. It was also referred to as the Rhenish Palatinate. It then became part of the newly formed federal state of Rhineland-Palatinate.

Geography 

The Rhine Circle largely covered the same area as the present Palatinate region, which lies west of the Rhine in the south of the German state of Rhineland-Palatinate, but included additionally the Saarland districts of Homburg and Sankt Ingbert. These were incorporated into the Saar region after the end of the  First World War and merged in 1974 into the Saarpfalz-Kreis. After the Second World War there were smaller losses of territory to the Saarland, especially in the area of Sankt Wendel. As part of the 1969 land reform the region designated as the Palatinate with Rhineland-Palatinate had its northern border changed somewhat. The Diocese of Speyer and the Evangelical Church of the Palatinate still exist today largely based on the historic boundaries of the Circle of the Rhine.

History 
The territory of the Rhine Circle, established in 1816, had been divided before 1792 into a total of 45 secular and ecclesiastical territories, some of which were very small. Electoral Palatinate and Bavaria had had dynastic links through the  family for centuries.

In 1794, the Left Bank of the Rhine, including the Palatinate, was occupied by French revolutionary troops. As a result of the Treaty of Campo Formio (1797) the First French Republic annexed the region and introduced an administrative system in 1798.

Following the defeat of Napoleon at the Battle of Leipzig in 1813 and the capture of the Left Bank of the Rhine by the Allies in January 1814, from 2 February 1814 the region was initially under the provisional authority of the  General Government of the Middle Rhine, but, from 16 June that same year, it was placed under the administration of the Imperial-Royal Austrian and Royal Bavarian Joint Land Administration Commission.

The joint Austro-Bavarian administration was initially retained, however.

On 14 April 1816, a treaty was signed between Austria and Bavaria, in which the various territorial changes were agreed. According to Article 2 of the treaty, Emperor Francis I of Austria ceded various regions to Maximilian I of Bavaria. These included, in addition to various regions east of the Rhine, the following regions west of the Rhine:

 In the  :

The effective date for these changes was stated as 1 May 1816.

In accordance with the prevailing Bavarian administrative structure, the region was given the name "Rhine Circle" with Speyer as its capital. Of the former French administrative structure, the subdivision of the region into cantons, mayoralties and municipalities was retained.

As his first provincial governor, King Maximilian selected the Privy Councillor , whose name is responsible for the popular Palatinate nickname for Bavarian officials, .

See also 
 History of the Palatinate: Bavarian period

References

External links 
 territorial.de
 verwaltungsgeschichte.de
 The Palatinate with population statistics in 1900/10

History of the Palatinate (region)
Kingdom of Bavaria
Palatinate
Former states and territories of Rhineland-Palatinate